Pamela Anne Eldred (April 21, 1948 - July 12, 2022) was an American beauty pageant titleholder who was crowned Miss Michigan 1969 and later Miss America 1970.

Early life and education
Eldred is from West Bloomfield and graduated from University of Detroit Mercy.

Pageantry
She was crowned Miss America 1970 on September 6, 1969. A ballerina, Eldred performed a dance in the Miss America talent competition to music from Romeo and Juliet. One of the five finalists Eldred defeated in the Miss America 1970 pageant was singer and actress Susan Anton.

She participated in the home-coming of Kirsten Haglund along with Nancy Fleming Lange and Kaye Lani Rae Rafko Wilson, both former Miss Michigans who also became Miss America.

Personal life
After her year as Miss America 1970, she married Dr. Jules F. Levey and had a daughter, Hilary Levey (Friedman), a Harvard-educated sociologist. She remarried in 1998 to lawyer Norman Robbins, who is 29 years her senior.
Eldred died in her native Michigan on July 12, 2022 at the age of 74.

References

Living people
1948 births
Miss America 1970 delegates
Miss America Preliminary Swimsuit winners
Miss America winners
People from West Bloomfield, Michigan
University of Detroit Mercy alumni